James Phillips (born 29 April 1977) is a British playwright, director and photographer.

Educated at St Catherine's College, Oxford, Phillips' first play, The Rubenstein Kiss, won both the John Whiting Award (2006) and the TMA Award for Best Play. As a director he has worked extensively and was a recipient of the National Arts Endowment Award for his first professional production, Frank McGuinness's  Observe the Sons of Ulster Marching Towards the Somme at the Pleasance, London.

Plays
The Little Fir Tree (2004) premiered at Sheffield Theatres, directed by James Phillips
The Rubenstein Kiss (2005) premiered at the Hampstead Theatre, directed by James Phillips
Wind in the Willows (2010) adapted for Latitude Festival, directed by Alan Lane
Time and the City (2011) premiered in Hull for Slung Low Theatre Company, directed by Alan Lane
Hidden in the Sand (2013) premiered at Trafalgar Studios, directed by James Phillips
City Stories (2013-ongoing) resident at St James Theatre, London, transferred to 59E59 Theaters, New York in May 2016, directed by James Phillips
The White Whale (2014) premiered in Leeds for Slung Low Theatre Company, directed by Alan Lane
Camelot: The Shining City (2015) premiering at Sheffield Theatres, directed by Alan Lane
McQueen (2015) premiering at St James Theatre, London, transferred to Theatre Royal, Haymarket, London in August 2015, directed by John Caird
Flood (2017) premiering as part of  Hull UK City of Culture 2017, directed by Alan Lane

Other work
If We Dead Awaken (2012), TV drama for Coming Up, Channel 4, directed by Luke McManus
Nicosia: The Last Dividing Line (2013), book of documentary photography, published by En Tipis (Nicosia, Cyprus)

References

External links
The Stage article about James Phillips winning John Whiting Award
City Stories website
Photography
Bloomsbury Publishing author page

21st-century British dramatists and playwrights
1977 births
Living people
British male dramatists and playwrights
Alumni of St Catherine's College, Oxford
21st-century British male writers